Christopher John Barnard (2 September 1952 – 1 June 2007) was a British evolutionary biologist, Professor of Animal Behaviour at the University of Nottingham from 1996 until his death.

References 

1952 births
2007 deaths
20th-century British zoologists
Ethologists
Academics of the University of Nottingham